The 2011 Korean League Cup, also known as the Rush & Cash Cup 2011, was the 24th and the last competition of the Korean League Cup. It began on 16 March 2011, and ended on 13 July 2011.

Group stage
All K League clubs excluding participating clubs of the 2011 AFC Champions League entered the group stage.

Group A

Group B

Knockout stage

Teams

Bracket

Quarter-finals

Semi-finals

Final

Statistics

Top scorers

Top assist providers

Awards

Source:

See also
 2011 in South Korean football
 2011 K League
 2011 Korean FA Cup

References

External links
Official website 
Review at K League 

2011
2011 domestic association football cups
2011 in South Korean football